Chowka  (also spelled as Chauka) is a village in the Chandil CD block in the Chandil subdivision of the Seraikela Kharsawan district in the Indian state of Jharkhand.

Geography

Location                                  

Area overview 
The area shown in the map has been described as “part of the southern fringe of the Chotanagpur plateau and is a hilly upland tract”. 75.7% of the population lives in the rural areas and 24.3% lives in the urban areas.

Note: The map alongside presents some of the notable locations in the district. All places marked in the map are linked in the larger full screen map.

Civic administration 
There is a police station at Chowka.

Demographics 
According to the 2011 Census of India, Chauka had a total population of 1,492, of which 780 (52%) were males and 712 (48%) were females. Population in the age range 0–6 years was 200. The total number of literate persons in Chauka was 1046 (80.96% of the population over 6 years).

(*For language details see Chandil block#Language and religion)

Education 
Government High School Chowka is a Hindi-medium coeducational institution established in 1958. It has facilities for teaching in classes IX and X.

References 

Villages in Seraikela Kharsawan district